Szewce  is a village in the administrative district of Gmina Samborzec, within Sandomierz County, Świętokrzyskie Voivodeship, in south-central Poland.

Demographics
The village is wholly Polish in population and entirely Roman Catholic. Almost all of the inhabitants farm, with common crops being apples, cucumbers, tomatoes and a token amount of livestock including chicken, duck and swine. 
The town lacks churches, schools, stores, or any sort of municipal building but does have a volunteer fire brigade.

Szewce features only one paved road (79) which runs to Sandomierz and one unpaved road with no signage which runs to Skotniki.

References

Szewce